Stinkweed is a common name for several noxiously scented plants, and may refer to:

Ailanthus altissima (stinkweed tree)
Artemisia tilesii, known as stinkweed in Alaska
Cleomella
Datura stramonium (jimson weed)
Diplotaxis muralis, known as stinkweed in the United Kingdom
Thlaspi arvense (field pennycress)
Cannabis indica (Indian hemp)